Walckenaeria crocea is a spider species first described by A. F. Millidge in 1983. The male holotype Millidge used was found 15 miles west of Ciudad Hidalgo in Tepetates Pass, Michoacán, Mexico.

References

Linyphiidae
Spiders of Mexico
Spiders described in 1983